Acropora retusa  is a species of Acropora coral found in U.S. waters in Guam, American Samoa, and the Pacific Remote Island Areas

References

External links
 
 

Acropora